The Glossosomatoidea are a superfamily of the class Insecta and order Trichoptera.

References 

Insect superfamilies
Spicipalpia